Prof. Dr. Hab. Jerzy Strzelczyk (born 24 December 1941 in Poznań) is Polish historian, professor at the Adam Mickiewicz University.

External links 
 Biography

1941 births
Living people
20th-century Polish historians
Polish male non-fiction writers
Members of the Polish Academy of Learning
Adam Mickiewicz University in Poznań alumni
Academic staff of Adam Mickiewicz University in Poznań
Recipients of the Order of Polonia Restituta
21st-century Polish historians